The Fisher FP-404 is a Canadian single-seat, conventional landing gear, single-engined biplane kit aircraft designed for construction by amateur builders. Fisher Flying Products was originally based in Edgeley, North Dakota, USA but the company is now located in Woodbridge, Ontario, Canada.

Development
The FP-404 was designed by Fisher Aircraft in the United States in 1984 and was the company's first design that was too heavy for the US FAR 103 Ultralight Vehicles category, with the category's maximum  empty weight. The 404's standard empty weight is  when equipped with a two-stroke  Rotax 503 engine, putting it into the US experimental-amateur-built category, although it qualifies as an ultralight in other countries, such as Canada. The design goal was to provide a nostalgic aircraft reminiscent of the biplanes of the 1930s, as the company explains "The FP-404 represents a reborn era in airborne adventure. This bi-plane aircraft is a throw-back to seat-of-the-pants flying, complete with minimal instruments and bare-necessity controls."

The construction of the FP-404 is similar to the Fisher FP-202 Koala. The aircraft's structure is entirely made from wood, with the wooden fuselage built from wood strips arranged in a geodesic form, resulting in a very strong and light aircraft with redundant load paths. Both the wings and fuselage are covered with doped aircraft fabric. The wings are strut-braced with both interplane struts and cabane struts. The aircraft has no flaps. The company claims it takes an amateur builder 500 hours to build the FP-404, "using normal household tools".

Early versions of the FP-404 were equipped with the  Rotax 277 in an attempt to keep the aircraft under the US FAR 103 Ultralight Vehicles weight limit but the aircraft was found to be under-powered due to its short wing span and high-drag configuration. Heavier engines, like the  Rotax 447 and  Rotax 503 engines provided adequate power but put the 404 over the category weight limit. These models were designated as the Fisher 404 EXP to show that they would not qualify for the FAR 103 weight limit.

By late 2004 over 350 FP-404s were flying.

Reviewer Andre Cliche said about the design:

Variants
FP-404
Single-seat, single-engined biplane, initial version equipped with a  Rotax 277 powerplant for the FAR 103 Ultralight Vehicles category
FP-404 EXP
Single-seat, single-engined biplane, later version equipped with a  Rotax 447 or  Rotax 503 powerplant for the US experimental-amateur-built category

Specifications (FP-404 EXP)

See also

References

External links

Official website
Photo of FP-404

1980s Canadian ultralight aircraft
Aircraft first flown in 1984
Biplanes
Single-engined tractor aircraft